Overdrafting is the process of extracting groundwater beyond the equilibrium yield of an aquifer. Groundwater is one of the largest sources of fresh water and is found underground. The primary cause of groundwater depletion is the excessive pumping of groundwater up from underground aquifers.

There are two sets of yields: safe yield and sustainable yield. Safe yield is the amount of groundwater that can be withdrawn over a period of time without exceeding the long-term recharge rate or affecting the aquifer integrity. Sustainable yield is the amount of water extraction that can be sustained indefinitely without negative hydrological impacts, taking into account both recharge rate and surface water impacts.

There are two types of aquifers: confined and unconfined. In confined aquifers, there is an overbearing layer called aquitard, which contains impermeable materials through which groundwater cannot be extracted. In unconfined aquifers, there is no aquitard, and groundwater can be freely extracted from the surface. Extracting groundwater from unconfined aquifers is like borrowing the water: it has to be recharged at a proper rate. Recharge can happen through artificial recharge and natural recharge. 

Insufficient recharge can lead to depletion, reducing the usefulness of the aquifer for humans. Depletion can also have impacts on the environment around the aquifer, such as soil compression and land subsidence, local climatic change, soil chemistry changes, and other deterioration of the local environment.

Mechanism 
When groundwater is extracted from an aquifer, a cone of depression is created around the well. As the drafting of water continues, the cone increases in radius. Extracting too much water (overdrafting) can lead to negative impacts such as a drop of the water table, land subsidence, and loss of surface water reaching the streams. In extreme cases, the supply of water that naturally recharges the aquifer is pulled directly from streams and rivers, lowering their water levels. This affects wildlife, as well as humans who might be using the water for other purposes.

The natural process of aquifer recharge takes place through the percolation of surface water. An aquifer may be artificially recharged, such as by pumping reclaimed water from wastewater management projects directly into the aquifer. An example of is the Orange County Water District in California. This organization takes wastewater, treats it to a proper level, and then systematically pumps it back into the aquifers for artificial recharge.

Since every groundwater basin recharges at a different rate depending on precipitation, vegetative cover, and soil conservation practices, the quantity of groundwater that can be safely pumped varies greatly among regions of the world and even within provinces. Some aquifers require a very long time to recharge, and thus overdrafting can effectively dry up certain sub-surface water supplies. Subsidence occurs when excessive groundwater is extracted from rocks that support more weight when saturated. This can lead to a capacity reduction in the aquifer.

Changes in freshwater availability stem from natural and human activities (in conjunction with climate change) that interfere with groundwater recharge patterns. One of the leading anthropogenic activities causing groundwater depletion is irrigation. Roughly 40% of global irrigation is supported by groundwater, and irrigation is the primary activity causing groundwater storage loss across the U.S.

Around the world 

 
This ranking is based on the amount of groundwater each country uses for agriculture. This issue is becoming significant in the United States (most notably in California), but it has been an ongoing problem in other parts of the world, such as was documented in Punjab, India, in 1987.

United States 
In the U.S., an estimated 800 km3 of groundwater was depleted during the 20th century. The development of cities and other areas of highly concentrated water usage has created a strain on groundwater resources. In post-development scenarios, interactions between surface water and groundwater are reduced; there is less intermixing between the surface and subsurface (interflow), leading to depleted water tables.

Groundwater recharge rates are also affected by rising temperatures which increase surface evaporation and transpiration, resulting in decreased water content of the soil. Anthropogenic changes to groundwater storage, such as over-pumping and the depletion of water tables combined with climate change, effectively reshape the hydrosphere and impact the ecosystems that depend on the groundwater.

Accelerated decline in subterranean reservoirs
According to a 2013 report by research hydrologist Leonard F. Konikow at the United States Geological Survey (USGS), the depletion of the Ogallala Aquifer between 20012008 is about 32% of the cumulative depletion during the entire 20th century. In the United States, the biggest users of water from aquifers include agricultural irrigation, and oil and coal extraction. According to Konikow, "Cumulative total groundwater depletion in the United States accelerated in the late 1940s and continued at an almost steady linear rate through the end of the century. In addition to widely recognized environmental consequences, groundwater depletion also adversely impacts the long-term sustainability of groundwater supplies to help meet the Nation’s water needs."

As reported by another USGS study of withdrawals from 66 major US aquifers, the three greatest uses of water extracted from aquifers were irrigation (68%), public water supply (19%), and "self-supplied industrial" (4%). The remaining 8% of groundwater withdrawals were for "self-supplied domestic, aquaculture, livestock, mining, and thermoelectric power uses."

Environmental impacts 

The environmental impacts of overdrafting include:

 Groundwater-related subsidence: the collapse of land due to lack of support (from the water that is being depleted). The first recorded case of land subsidence was in the 1940s. Land subsidence can be as little as local land collapsing or as large as an entire region's land being lowered. The subsidence can lead to infrastructural and ecosystem damage.
 Lowering of the water table, which makes water harder to reach streams and rivers
 Reduction of water volume in streams and lakes because their supply of water is being diminished by surface water recharging the aquifers
 Impacts on animals that depend on streams and lakes for food, water, and habitat
 Deterioration to air quality and water quality
 Increase in the cost of water to the consumer due to a lower water table—more energy is needed to pump further down, so operating costs increase for companies, who pass on the expense to the consumer
 Decrease in crop production from lack of water (a large loss in the U.S. in particular, where 60% of irrigation relies on groundwater)
 Disturbances to the water cycle

Groundwater related subsidence

Climatic changes

Aquifer drawdown or overdrafting and the pumping of fossil water may be contributing to sea-level rise. By increasing the amount of moisture available to fall as precipitation, severe weather events are more likely to occur. To some extent, moisture in the atmosphere accelerates the probability of a global warming event. The correlation coefficient is not yet scientifically determined.

Socio-economic effects 
Scores of countries are overpumping aquifers as they struggle to satisfy their growing water needs, including each of the big three grain producers: China, India, and the United States. These three, along with several other countries where water tables are falling, are home to more than half the world's people.

Water is intrinsic to biological and economic growth, and overdrafting reduces its available supply. According to Liebig's law of the minimum, population growth is therefore impeded. Deeper wells must be drilled as the water table drops, which can become expensive. In addition, the energy needed to extract a given volume of water increases with the amount the aquifer has been depleted. The deeper the water is extracted the worse the quality of the water becomes, which increases the cost of filtration. Saltwater intrusion is another consequence of overdrafting, leading to a reduction in water quality.

Possible solutions 
Since recharge is the natural replenishment of water, artificial recharge is the man-made replenishment of groundwater. This is the more aesthetically pleasing option. However, one problem is the limited amount of suitable water available for replenishing.

In areas where recharge alone will not work, decreased water use can also be used. Notably, this requires actions such as switching to less water-intensive crops. Consumptive use refers to the water that is naturally taken from the system (for example, in transpiration).

See also
Cone of depression
Groundwater recharge
Groundwater-related subsidence
Drinking water
Overexploitation
Water crisis
Human overpopulation

References

External links 
The Perils of Groundwater Pumping, Issues in Science and Technology

Aquifers
Environmental impact of agriculture
Environmental issues with water
Water supply
Water and the environment